Justice Callow may refer to:

Keith M. Callow (1925–2008), associate justice of the Washington Supreme Court
William G. Callow (1921–2018), associate justice of the Wisconsin Supreme Court